The 1955 NBA All Star Game was the fifth NBA All-Star Game.  Bill Sharman was named the game's MVP after scoring ten of his fifteen points in the fourth quarter, while his teammate Bob Cousy led all scorers with 20 points.

Roster

Eastern Conference
Head Coach: Al Cervi, Syracuse Nationals

Western Conference
Head Coach: Charley Eckman, Fort Wayne Pistons

References 

National Basketball Association All-Star Game
All-Star Game
Sports in Manhattan
Basketball in New York City
NBA All-Star Game
Sports competitions in New York City
NBA All-Star Game
1950s in Manhattan
Madison Square Garden